Podocarpus gnidioides is a species of conifer in the family Podocarpaceae. It is found only in New Caledonia.

References

gnidioides
Least concern plants
Taxonomy articles created by Polbot
Taxa named by Élie-Abel Carrière